The Eyre Telegraph Station is a building on the remote south coast of Western Australia, on the Great Australian Bight.  Built in 1897 of local limestone, it is a substantial one-storey structure, with a wide timber-framed verandah and a corrugated iron roof, that housed a telegraph repeater station on the line between Adelaide, South Australia, and Albany, Western Australia. It is now within the Nuytsland Nature Reserve, below the Nullarbor Plain escarpment, and is surrounded by mallee woodland and sand dunes.

The building replaced an earlier and less substantial wooden one built when the telegraph was first constructed in 1875–1877. It would have been manned by a Telegraph Master with one or more assistants.

After operating for 50 years, the telegraph station was closed in 1927, and the building was left to decay for the next 50.  In 1977, it was the focus of a restoration program by the Royal Australasian Ornithologists Union, now BirdLife Australia, with assistance from the Western Australian Department of Fisheries and Wildlife and the Post Office Historical Society, to establish it as the Eyre Bird Observatory, Australia's first.  The building is listed on the Australian Register of the National Estate.

See also
 Australian telegraphic history

References
 Eyre Telegraph Station
 Eyre Bird Observatory

Buildings and structures in Western Australia
Nullarbor Plain
History of telecommunications in Australia
1897 establishments in Australia
1927 disestablishments in Australia
Telegraph stations in Australia
Limestone buildings
State Register of Heritage Places in the Shire of Dundas